Dirk Frans Arie "Dick" Langerhorst (26 March 1946 – 13 May 2008) was a Dutch swimmer. He competed in three events at the 1964 and 1968 Summer Olympics, but failed to reach the finals. Between 1964 and 1969 he dominated national championships, winning 24 titles and setting 27 national records in freestyle and butterfly disciplines.

After retiring from swimming he continued playing water polo and worked as a fitness coach.

References

1946 births
2008 deaths
Dutch male freestyle swimmers
Dutch male butterfly swimmers
Olympic swimmers of the Netherlands
Swimmers at the 1964 Summer Olympics
Swimmers at the 1968 Summer Olympics
Swimmers from Amsterdam
20th-century Dutch people